Grown-ish (stylized as ish) is an American sitcom series and a spin-off of the ABC series Black-ish. The single-camera comedy follows the Johnson family's children as they go to college and begin their journeys to adulthood, only to quickly discover that not everything goes their way once they leave the nest. The first four seasons follow eldest daughter Zoey (Yara Shahidi), with Deon Cole, Trevor Jackson, Francia Raisa, Emily Arlook, Jordan Buhat, Chloe Bailey, Halle Bailey, Luka Sabbat and Chris Parnell also starring, while the fifth season onward follows eldest son and Zoey's younger brother Andre Junior (Marcus Scribner) as he attends college after Zoey's graduation, with Diggy Simmons and Daniella Perkins also starring.

Created by Black-ishs Kenya Barris and Larry Wilmore, the series is produced by Khalabo Ink Society, Cinema Gypsy Productions and Principato-Young Entertainment, with Anthony Anderson, Brian Dobbins, and Helen Sugland acting as executive producers. Freeform officially ordered 13 episodes of the spin-off in May 2017, and it premiered on January 3, 2018. In January 2018, Freeform renewed the series for a second season of 21 episodes which premiered on January 2, 2019. In February 2019, Freeform renewed the series for a third season, which premiered on January 16, 2020. In January 2020, the series was renewed for a fourth season, while the second half of the third season premiered on January 21, 2021. The fourth season premiered on July 8, 2021. The second half of the fourth season premiered on January 27, 2022, with the majority of the original cast departing at the end of the season. In March 2022, the series was renewed for a forthcoming fifth season and Marcus Scribner and Daniella Perkins upped to series regulars, the former following the series finale of Black-ish, replacing Shahidi as lead character and narrator of the series. The first half of the fifth season premiered on July 20, 2022. In January 2023, the series was renewed for a sixth season.

Plot
The first four seasons follow the Johnson family's firstborn daughter Zoey leaves the family to go to college. As she attends the fictional California University of Liberal Arts (Cal U for short) while befriending some people, she discovers that her journey to adulthood and her departure from the family does not go the way she hoped. The fifth season onward follows the Johnson family's firstborn son, Zoey's younger brother and former college dropout Junior as he attends Cal U following Zoey's graduation.

Cast and characters

Main
 Yara Shahidi as Zoey Johnson (main seasons 1–present), the narrator and main protagonist of the series who is actually shown in the break of a scene. She meets her six core friends in Professor Telphy's class. She originally intended to become a fashion designer but has since created her own major, "The Sociology of Fashion", and turned her career goals to fashion styling. She is a freshman in Season 1, a sophomore in Season 2, a junior in Season 3, and a senior in Season 4. She dated Luca until their breakup at the end of season 2. She began dating Aaron in the Season 3 finale. As of the Season 3 break, she has dropped out of Cal U to focus on her career as a stylist, then quit her job to re-enroll at Cal U. She graduates at the end of season 4 and moves to New York to start up her and Luca's fashion company Anti-Muse.
 Deon Cole as Professor Charlie Telphy (main seasons 1–2; recurring seasons 3–4), a close friend of Zoey's family and former night time adjunct professor turned dean of students at Cal U teaching a class called "Digital Marketing Strategies", which is all about drones. He becomes Dean in Season 2.
 Trevor Jackson as Aaron Jackson (main seasons 1–present), a student at Cal U. He is "woke", as evident by his many buttons to various causes dealing with African Americans. He later takes up a job as an RA for Hawkins Hall in Season 2. He is a sophomore in Season 1, a junior in Season 2, and a senior in Season 3. In the Season 3 finale, he graduates. In Season 4, he starts teaching night classes at Cal U.
 Francia Raisa as Analisa "Ana" Patricia Torres (main seasons 1–4; guest season 5), a student at Cal U. She was born to Cuban immigrants, is a devout Catholic, and a Republican. She was Zoey's roommate in Season 1. In the second season, she and Zoey move into an apartment with Nomi and she develops a romantic interest in Aaron. Ana is a freshman in Season 1, a sophomore in Season 2, a junior in Season 3, and a senior in Season 4. In Season 2, Episode 19, her major is revealed as Political Science. She gets scrutinized a lot for her constant need to get the answers she wants, even if it includes spying and snooping.
 Emily Arlook as Nomi Segal (main seasons 1–4; guest season 5), a Jewish American. She is bisexual, but she is not out to her family until season 2. She is a freshman in season 1 and then a sophomore in season 2, a junior in season 3, and a senior in season 4. At the start of the third season, she is revealed to be pregnant from a one-night stand. During the first half of season 3, she drops out of Cal U and returns to her parents' home while dealing with her pregnancy. In the second half of season 3, she returns to campus with her newborn daughter Luna. At the end of season 4, she moves to Connecticut to attend Yale Law School. 
 Jordan Buhat as Vivek Shah (main seasons 1–4; guest season 5), a first-generation Gujarati Indian American. His parents are devout Hindus. He is a drug dealer to support his fashion choices. He is an engineering major and has shown great intelligence throughout the series. He originally lived in the rich-kid Winthrop house but was kicked out in Season 2 and has been crashing at Hawkins Hall with Aaron and Doug. He is a freshman in Season 1, a sophomore in Season 2, and a junior in Season 3. He is best known as having a style that is highly influenced by black culture. In Season 3, he starts dating a girl named Heidi until the season finale. In season 4, Vivek gets expelled from Cal U following his arrest last season, which leads to his father disowning him; they are on the verge of reconciling when he dies of a heart ailment later on in the season. At the end of the season, he re-enrolls in a new college to complete his engineering degree.
 Chloe Bailey as Jazlyn "Jazz" Forster (main seasons 1–4; guest season 5), Sky's twin sister and a track athlete at Cal U. From South Los Angeles, she is intensely smart, sassy, but focused on the bigger picture. Her focus is lost after getting into a relationship with Doug, causing a rift to form between her and her sister. She is a Freshman in Season 1, a Sophomore in Season 2, a Junior in Season 3, and a Senior in Season 4. Her major is in Economics, as revealed in Season 2.
 Halle Bailey as Skylar "Sky" Forster (main seasons 1–3; recurring season 4), Jazz's twin sister and a track athlete at Cal U. From South Los Angeles, she is intensely smart, sassy, but focused on the bigger picture. She remains focused on her goals even while also partying and meeting guys, something her sister has trouble with which causes a rift between them. She is a Freshman in Season 1, a Sophomore in Season 2, and a Junior in Season 3. Her major is in Early Childhood Education, as revealed in Season 2. She leaves for Tokyo at the end of Season 3 after gaining a spot on the Olympic Team.
 Luka Sabbat as Luca Hall (main seasons 1–4), a fashion design major at Cal U and is a stoner. He is very independent and a trendsetter, as seen in his outlandish fashion choices and his relaxed attitude toward life. He also works alongside Zoey at Teen Vogue, an internship he got by chance. Zoey and Luca become an official couple starting season 2 but break up in the season 2 finale. He is a freshman in season 1, a sophomore in season 2, a junior in Season 3, and a senior in Season 4.
 Chris Parnell as Dean Burt Parker (main season 1), the Dean of Students. He is also Nomi's uncle. He leaves the university for unknown reasons before the events of season 2.
 Diggy Simmons as Douglas Frederick "Doug" Edwards (main season 3–present; recurring seasons 1–2), Jazlyn's ex-boyfriend. He is best friends with Aaron and Vivek.
 Marcus Scribner as Andre "Junior" Johnson (main season 5; recurring seasons 2–3; guest season 4), Zoey's younger brother from black-ish. He becomes Sky's romantic interest in season 2. Following Zoey's graduation at the end of season 4 and the series finale of black-ish, Junior replaces Zoey at the lead character and narrator of grown-ish, attending Cal U in the fifth season.
 Daniella Perkins as Kiela Hall (main season 5; recurring season 4), Luca's younger sister, and Doug's fling and love interest who just started at Cal-U alongside Junior in season 5, she becomes a sophomore and becomes Junior's new love interest.

Recurring
 Da'Vinchi as Cash Mooney (seasons 1–2), Zoey's first college boyfriend and star of the school's basketball team. Also, he's her first love and the first person she had sex with.
 Katherine Moennig as Professor Paige Hewson (season 2), the professor of Gender Studies class that Zoey and her friends are in who was also Nomi's love interest.
 Ryan Destiny as Jillian (season 3), a transfer student from Spelman College and Luca's new love interest.
 Henri Esteve as Javier / "Javi" (season 3–present), a gorgeous grad student whom Ana interns with at Cal U. Javier and Ana start dating in Season 3.
 Andrew Liner as Rodney (season 3), a soft-spoken, baby-faced babe with a killer smile who becomes Sky's new love interest.
 Raigan Harris as Rochelle (seasons 2–3; guest season 4), an opinionated, well-informed member of the Black Student Union who is always down to fight for a cause. Rochelle ends up dating Aaron most of Season 3. She and Zoey sparks a rivalry due to them both having feelings for Aaron. Before the Season 3 finale, Aaron breaks up with Rochelle after cheating on her with Zoey. In spite of helping Zoey obtain an internship in season 4, she is revealed to still be spiteful and angry towards her for the event.
 Tara Raani as Zaara Ali (season 5)
 Justine Skye as Annika Longstreet (season 5)
 Amelie Zilber as Lauryn Daniels (season 5)
 Ceyair Wright as Zeke Bracey (season 5)
 Matthew Sato as Brandon (season 5)
 Slick Woods as Sharon "Slick" (season 5)

Notable guests
 Anthony Anderson as Andre "Dre" Johnson Sr., Zoey's father
 Tracee Ellis Ross as Dr. Rainbow "Bow" Johnson, Zoey's mother
 Laurence Fishburne as Earl "Pops" Johnson, Zoey's grandfather
 Jenifer Lewis as Ruby Johnson, Zoey's grandmother
 Miles Brown as Jack Johnson, Zoey's younger brother and Diane's twin brother
 Marsai Martin as Diane Johnson, Zoey's younger sister and Jack's twin sister
 Joey Badass as himself
 Saweetie as Indigo
 Jordyn Woods as Dee
 DC Young Fly as Rafael

Notes

Episodes

Production
"Liberal Arts", the 23rd episode of season 3 of Black-ish, functioned as a backdoor pilot for this spin-off, featuring Yara Shahidi's character, Zoey Johnson, as she goes to college.  Shahidi stars in the series, with Chris Parnell, Mallory Sparks, Matt Walsh, and Trevor Jackson guest starring in the backdoor pilot. The series was later titled College-ish, with Parnell and Jackson reprising their roles from the backdoor pilot, and Emily Arlook replacing Mallory Sparks in the role of Miriam. In August 2017, Francia Raisa joined the cast as Ana along with Jordan Buhat as Vivek. Music duo Chloe and Halle would also star as twin sisters Sky and Jazz.

On May 19, 2017, Freeform (ABC's sister network) officially ordered 13 episodes of the spin-off under the final title, Grown-ish. On January 18, 2018, Freeform renewed the series for a second season. On February 5, 2019, the series was renewed for a third season. On November 7, 2019, it was announced that the third season will premiere on January 16, 2020. On January 17, 2020, Freeform renewed the series for a fourth season.

On May 19, 2020, Freeform announced that the remaining episodes from season three will premiere in 2021 due to the impact of COVID-19 pandemic in the television industry.

The fourth season premiered on July 8, 2021, with the majority of the original cast leaving at its conclusion.

On March 7, 2022, Freeform renewed the series for a fifth season with Marcus Scribner joining the cast, replacing Shahidi as lead character of the series, as Junior Johnson, Zoey's younger brother from black-ish, with Zakiyyah Alexander and Courtney Lilly showrunning the season, which follows Junior as he finally decides to attend college. On May 4, 2022, it was announced that the first half of the fifth season would premiere on July 20, 2022. On January 11, 2023, Freeform renewed the series for a sixth season.

Release
The series premiered on January 3, 2018, on Freeform. Grown-ish airs in Canada on ABC Spark, simulcast with Freeform in the United States. Globally, the series is also available on Disney+.

Reception

Critical response
On review aggregator Rotten Tomatoes, the first season has an approval rating of 95% based on 39 reviews, with an average rating of 7.90/10. The website's critical consensus reads, "grown-ish quickly works through its growing pains to establish itself as its own socially aware show with a fresh perspective on the college experience, driven by the charming and capable Yara Shahidi." Metacritic, which uses a weighted average, assigned a score of 71 out of 100, based on 15 critics, indicating "generally favorable reviews."

On review aggregator Rotten Tomatoes, the second season has an approval rating of 100% based on 5 reviews, with an average rating of 7.70/10.

Ratings

Accolades

References

External links
 
 

Black-ish
2018 American television series debuts
2010s American black sitcoms
2010s American college television series
2010s American LGBT-related comedy television series
2010s American single-camera sitcoms
2010s American teen sitcoms
2020s American black sitcoms
2020s American college television series
2020s American LGBT-related comedy television series
2020s American single-camera sitcoms
2020s American teen sitcoms
American television spin-offs
English-language television shows
Freeform (TV channel) original programming
Television shows set in Los Angeles
Television series by ABC Studios
American LGBT-related sitcoms